Željko Franulović was the defending champion but lost in the semifinals to Buster Mottram.

Guillermo Vilas won in the final 6–1, 6–3, 6–3 against Mottram.

Seeds

  Guillermo Vilas (champion)
  Buster Mottram (final)
  Balázs Taróczy (semifinals)
  Karl Meiler (quarterfinals)
  Hans Gildemeister (second round)
  Željko Franulović (semifinals)
  Pat Du Pré (first round)
  Jiří Hřebec (first round)

Draw

Final

Section 1

Section 2

External links
 1978 Romika Cup Singles draw

Singles